Gray-Taylor House is a historic home located at Brookville, Jefferson County, Pennsylvania. It was built in 1882, and is a three-story, brick dwelling with a two-story rear wing in the Second Empire-style.  It features a three-story projecting bay window, mansard roof, and a one-story open porch across the front facade.

It was added to the National Register of Historic Places in 1979.  It is located in the Brookville Historic District.

References

Houses on the National Register of Historic Places in Pennsylvania
Second Empire architecture in Pennsylvania
Houses completed in 1882
Houses in Jefferson County, Pennsylvania
National Register of Historic Places in Jefferson County, Pennsylvania